Beheaded is the second studio album by Texas-based indie rock band Bedhead, released 1996 through Trance Syndicate. The album was released in the United Kingdom through Rough Trade, and was reissued on compact disc format through Touch & Go Records on February 20, 2001, along with the band's other two albums WhatFunLifeWas and Transaction de Novo. The album was included in the Numero Group's 2014 boxset 1992–1998 and was also released separately on LP format.

Critical reception
CMJ New Music Monthly wrote that the album "reveals the band's mastery of its technique: Matt and Bubba Kadane's whispered, spoken or half-sung vocals trickle through the plodding, strangely dynamic songs, which are bolstered by the band's three-guitar approach, though not in a predictable strength-in-numbers fashion."

Track listing

Personnel 
Adapted from the Beheaded liner notes.

Bedhead
 Kris Wheat – bass
 Trini Martinez – drums
 Bubba Kadane – guitar, vocals ("Left Behind", "Smoke", and "Withdraw")
 Tench Coxe – guitar
 Matt Kadane – guitar, vocals

Production
 John Golden – mastering
 Adam Wiltzie – mixing, recording
 Bedhead – production, recording, mixing

Release history

References

External links 
 

1996 albums
Bedhead (band) albums